High Seas is a 1929 British adventure film directed by Denison Clift and starring Lillian Rich, James Carew, John Stuart, Randle Ayrton and Winter Hall. The film follows a wealthy young man who falls in love with a sailor's daughter who saves him from a shipwreck. When he announces he wants to marry her, his family try to foil the match. It was based on a story by Monckton Hoffe.

Cast
 Lillian Rich as Faith Jeffrey
 John Stuart as Tiny Bracklethorpe
 Randle Ayrton as Captain Jeffrey
 Winter Hall as Lord Bracklethorpe
 Janet Alexander as Lady Bracklethorpe
 James Carew as Jaeger
 Daisy Campbell as Mrs Jeffrey

References

Bibliography
 Wood, Linda. British Films, 1927-1939. British Film Institute, 1986.

External links
 

1929 films
British adventure films
Films shot at British International Pictures Studios
1929 adventure films
Films directed by Denison Clift
Seafaring films
Films set in England
British black-and-white films
1920s English-language films
1920s British films